The Sakuya Konohana Kan (咲くやこの花館) is a botanical garden set within one of the world's largest greenhouses, located in Tsurumi Ryokuchi park at 2-163 Ryokuchi Koen, Tsurumi-ku, Osaka, Japan. It is open daily except Mondays; an admission fee is charged.

The gardens were constructed between 1987 and 1989, and currently contain about 15,000 plants representing 2,600 species from various climatic zones. Total floor space is about 6,900 m² with a maximum height of 30 meters. The conservatory is divided into a number of cool and hot houses as follows:

 Alpine House - 200 alpine plant species including primula, blue poppy from the Himalayas and western China, and alpine plants from the Alps, Rockies, and Japanese mountains
 Arctic and Antarctic Plant Area - cold-region flora including moss from the Showa Station (Antarctica) and Saxifraga oppositifolia from the Arctic Circle
 Flower Hall - exhibit hall with coconut palm trees
 Humid Tropical Plant House - jungle plants from the tropics, including orchids, palm trees, and Chinese banyan
 Succulent Plant House - desert plants from Africa, Madagascar, Australia, and Latin America
 Tropical Aquatic Plant Area - aquatic plants including waterlily, victorias, and mangroves
 Tropical Flowering Trees and Shrubs
 Tropical Insectivorous Plant Area - Nepenthes and other carnivorous plants
 Tropical Water Plants in Aquarium - aquatic plants within an aquarium

The greenhouse's name is taken from the phrase Sakuya Konohana (咲くやこの花), the beginning of a poem collected in the Kokin Wakashū anthology edited in 905 at Emperor Daigo's order. It means "Now is the time for the blossoms to bloom in Osaka".

See also 
 List of botanical gardens in Japan

References 
 Osaka City Tourism entry (Japanese)
 Osaka City Planning article
 Tsurumi Ryokuchi Park

Botanical gardens in Japan
Gardens in Osaka Prefecture
Greenhouses in Japan
Buildings and structures in Osaka
Parks and gardens in Osaka